Scraps Wessels (13 September 1871 – 6 April 1929) was a South African international rugby union player who played as a forward.

He made 3 appearances for South Africa against the British Lions in 1896.

References

South African rugby union players
South Africa international rugby union players
1874 births
1929 deaths
Rugby union forwards
Western Province (rugby union) players